The O'Brien–Peuschel Farmstead is located in Mequon, Wisconsin, United States. It was added to the National Register of Historic Places in 2000.

References

Houses in Ozaukee County, Wisconsin
Farms on the National Register of Historic Places in Wisconsin
Greek Revival houses in Wisconsin
National Register of Historic Places in Ozaukee County, Wisconsin